Cymbopogon ambiguus, or Australian lemon-scented grass, is a plant species in the family Poaceae. It has fragrant, bluish-green grey leaves and fluffy seed heads. It is self-fertile.

Cultivation
Cymbopogon ambiguus needs a sunny position. It can tolerate extreme dryness once established. Propagation is by division of clumps or from seed. Lemongrass can be grown in any soil and needs very little water.

Uses
Infusions and concoctions of Cymbopogon ambiguus have been used in traditional Aboriginal Australian medicine to treat headaches, chest infections, and muscle cramps. It has also been proposed as a candidate for rhizoremediation of hydrocarbon-contaminated soils.

Read also 

 Cymbopogon

References

ambiguus